Katyń is a 2007 Polish historical drama film about the 1940 Katyn massacre, directed by Academy Honorary Award winner Andrzej Wajda. It is based on the book Post Mortem: The Story of Katyn by Andrzej Mularczyk. It was nominated for Best Foreign Language Film for the 80th Academy Awards.

Wajda’s Katyń is the first screen portrayal of this long-suppressed and “highly controversial historical event.”

Historical Background

Six months before the massacres at Katyn, on August 23, 1939, Soviet leader Joseph Stalin authorized the signing of the Molotov-Ribbentrop Pact, a non-aggression agreement with Adolf Hitler’s Nazi Germany. Within days, German troops invaded western Poland, the first action aimed at fulfilling Hitler’s ultimate goal of “Lebensraum,” Within days, Stalin sent Soviet troops into eastern Poland, a region historically at odds with its former rival, Tsarist Russia. Hundreds of thousands of Poles, including soldiers, officers and civilians were incarcerated or transported to the Soviet Union.

Executions of prisoners

In early 1940, the head of the Russian secret police (NKVD), Lavrentiy Beria, was authorized by Stalin to liquidate selected prisoners. Most of the victims were murdered in the Katyn forest near Smolensk, Russia, at  Kalinin (Tver), and at Kharkiv prison, where Wajda’s father, a Polish cavalry officer, was executed.

Over 20,000 members of Poland’s intelligentsia and military forces were slaughtered, usually by a bullet to the head. Stalin’s rationale for the extermination of Polish executive and military staff was that it eliminated social and political elements that may have organized opposition to his policies.

When the Germans had established military bases in Poland, Hitler launched his invasion of the Soviet Union—Operation Barbarossa—which would kill tens of millions of Russian civilians and soldiers.

Plot

The events of Katyn are relayed through the eyes of the women, the mothers, wives, and daughters of the victims executed on Stalin's orders by the NKVD in 1940.

Andrzej (Artur Zmijewski) is a young Polish captain in the 8th Uhlan Regiment of Duke Jozef Poniatowski, who keeps a detailed diary. In September 1939, following the Soviet invasion of Eastern Poland, he is taken prisoner by the Red Army, which separates the officers from the enlisted men, who are allowed to return home, while the officers are held. His wife Anna (Maja Ostaszewska) and daughter Weronika, nicknamed "Nika" (Wiktoria Gąsiewska), find him shortly before he is deported to the USSR. Presented with an opportunity to escape, he refuses on the basis of his oath of loyalty to the Polish military.

Helped by a sympathetic Soviet officer, Anna manages to return to the family's home in Krakow with her daughter. There, the Germans carry out Sonderaktion Krakau, shutting down Jagiellonian University and deporting professors to concentration camps. Andrzej's father is one of the professors deported; later, his wife gets a message that he died in a camp in 1941.

In a prisoner of war camp, Andrzej is detained for a while and continues to keep a diary. He carefully records the names of all his fellow officers who are removed from the camp, and the dates on which they are taken. During the winter, Andrzej is clearly suffering in the low temperature, and his colleague Jerzy (Andrzej Chyra) lends him an extra sweater. As it happens, the sweater has Jerzy's name written on it. Finally, Andrzej's is taken from the camp, while Jerzy is left behind.

In 1943, the population of Krakow is informed by the German occupation authorities about the Katyn massacre. Capitalizing on the Soviet crime, Nazi propaganda publishes lists with the names of the victims exhumed in mass graves behind the advancing German troops. Andrzej's name is not on the list, giving his wife and daughter hope.

After the war, Jerzy, who has survived, has enlisted in the People's Army of Poland (LWP), which is under the complete control of the pro-Soviet Polish United Worker's Party. He feels personal loyalty to his friends, loves his country, and has sympathy for those who have suffered. He visits Anna and her daughter to tell them that Andrzej is dead. Apparently, when the list of the names of the victims was compiled, Andrzej was misidentified as Jerzy on the basis of the name in the sweater that Jerzy had lent to Andrzej; it was Andrzej who was killed, not Jerzy. Despondent that he is now forced to acknowledge a lie and to serve those who killed his comrades in Katyn, Jerzy commits suicide.

Evidence of Soviet responsibility for the Katyn massacre is carefully concealed by the authorities. However, a few daring people working with the effects of the victims eventually deliver Andrzej's diary to his widow Anna. The diary clearly shows the date in 1940 when he must have been killed from the absence of entries on subsequent days. The date of the massacre is crucial for assigning responsibility: if it happened in 1940, the USSR controlled the territory, while by mid-1941 the Germans took control over it.

The film ends with a re-enactment of parts of the massacre, as several of the principal characters are executed along with other soldiers.

The film includes excerpts from German newsreels presenting the Katyn massacre as a Soviet crime, and excerpts from Soviet newsreels presenting the massacre as a German crime.

Production
Filming began on October 3, 2006, and ended on January 9, 2007. The film premiered on September 17, 2007, the anniversary of the Soviet invasion of Poland in 1939.

Cast

 Andrzej Chyra, as Jerzy – Porucznik (1st Lieutenant) in the 8th Uhlan Regiment
 Artur Żmijewski, as Andrzej – Rotmistrz (Captain) of 8th Uhlan Regiment
 Maja Ostaszewska, as Anna, wife of Andrzej
 Wiktoria Gąsiewska, as Weronika ("Nika"), daughter of Andrzej and Anna
 Władysław Kowalski, as Jan, father of Andrzej and a professor at the Kraków University
 Maja Komorowska, as Maria, mother of Andrzej
 Jan Englert, as General
 Danuta Stenka, as Róża, wife of the General
 Sergei Garmash, as Captain Popov - a sympathetic and protective Red Army officer
 Agnieszka Kawiorska, as Ewa, daughter of General and Róża
 Stanisława Celińska, as Stasia – a servant in the General's house
 Paweł Małaszyński, as Piotr Baszkowski, a lieutenant (porucznik pilot) with 1 Aviation Regiment, Dęblin
 Magdalena Cielecka, as sister of Piotr
 Agnieszka Glińska, as sister of Piotr
 Anna Radwan, as Elżbieta – a relative of Anna
 Antoni Pawlicki, as Tadeusz, son of Elżbieta
 Alicja Dąbrowska, as an actress
 Jakub Przebindowski, as priest Wikary
 Krzysztof Globisz, as a medical doctor
 Oleh Drach, as a commissar
 Jacek Braciak, as a lieutenant Klin

Reception

The premiere of Katyń exactly 68 years to the day after the Soviet invasion of Poland in 1939, was a “major political event”, attended by members of the Polish political establishment. Historian Stefan Steinberg writes:

Wajda acknowledged in his production notes that President Kaczynski had provided “honorary patronage” during the film’s production. 
Though Wajda reassured Berlin journalists that Katyń was not conceived as anti-Russian propaganda, conservative German chancellor, Angela Merkel attended its premiere.

Wajda ultimately registered a formal objection to President Kaczynski regarding the politicizing of Katyń. In one of his last interviews, shortly before his death in 2016, Wajda declared:

Katyń has an approval rating of 91% on review aggregator website Rotten Tomatoes, based on 68 reviews, and an average rating of 7.28/10. The website's critical consensus states, "Masterfully crafted by an experienced directorial hand, Katyn is a powerful, personal depiction of wartime tragedy". It also has a score of 81 out of 100 on Metacritic, based on 17 critics, indicating "universal acclaim".

Controversy

During the post-war era Soviet authorities in Poland suppressed the historical truth surrounding the events at Katyn. Dorota Niemtz writes:
 

Not until 1989, with the fall of Communism in Poland in 1989, did the first non-communist Polish government acknowledge that the crime was committed under the direction of Joseph Stalin. In 1990, Mikhail Gorbachev acknowledged Soviet responsibility for the Katyń massacre for the first time. In 1991, Boris Yeltsin made public the documents which had authorized the massacre. 

On September 18, 2007, Rossiyskaya gazeta, the official newspaper of the Russian government, published a short comment by Alexander Sabov claiming that the widely accepted version of the tragedy is based on a single dubious copy of a document related to the massacre, and hence the evidence for the Soviet responsibility would be unreliable. This prompted an immediate response from the Polish media. As a retort, the next day, Gazeta Wyborcza emphasized the formal admission by the Soviet Union of NKVD responsibility and republished documents to that effect.

In April 2009, the authorities of the People's Republic of China banned the movie from being distributed in the country due to its anti-communist ideology. However, imported copies are widely available.

See also
German–Soviet military parade in Brest-Litovsk
Poland–Russia relations
Soviet repressions of Polish citizens (1939–1946)
World War II Behind Closed Doors: Stalin, the Nazis and the West

Footnotes

Sources 
Michalek, Boleslaw. 1973. The Cinema of Andrzej Wajda. The Tanvity Press. A. S. Barnes and Company. New York. 
Niemitz, Dorata and Steinberg, Stefan. 2016. Polish film and theatre director Andrzej Wajda dead at 90. World Socialist Web Site, 14 October, 2016. https://www.wsws.org/en/articles/2016/10/14/wajd-o14.html  Retrieved 04 July, 2022.
Saubhik Ghosh. Katyn-Kolonko (The Katyn Crime). Bengali, EKDIN, Sunday Supplement Cover Story*
Steinberg, Stefan. 2008. Katyn—The political agenda of Polish filmmaker Andrzej Wajda. World Socialist Web Site, 05 March, 2008. https://www.wsws.org/en/articles/2008/03/berl-m05.html  Retrieved 09 July, 2022.

External links 
 
 
 Filmweb
 
 
 
 
 Interview with Wajda on Katyń

2007 films
2007 drama films
Films set in 1939
Films set in 1940
2000s Polish-language films
2000s Russian-language films
2000s German-language films
World War II prisoner of war films
World War II films based on actual events
Polish World War II films
Films about the Soviet Union in the Stalin era
Films directed by Andrzej Wajda
Films set in the Soviet Union
Military of Poland in films
Films set in Kraków
Films shot in Poland
Films shot in Kraków
Katyn massacre
Films about massacres
Polish historical drama films
Polish historical films
2007 multilingual films
Polish multilingual films